Zeppelinfjellet is a mountain in Oscar II Land at Spitsbergen, Svalbard. It reaches a height of 556 m.a.s.l. (1824 ft) and is located on the peninsula of Brøggerhalvøya, south of the former mining society of Ny-Ålesund and near Zeppelinhamna. The mountain is named after German military officer and airship designer Ferdinand von Zeppelin.

References

External links

Mountains of Spitsbergen